An Echo of Hooves is a 2003 album by folk singer June Tabor.

There were many albums consisting entirely of Child ballads in the 60s and 70s. By the 90s, such albums became rare. This is an outstanding example from the 21st century. The "Allmusic" said of this album "A stunning jewel in a remarkable career, and one of the best things Tabor’s ever released." Three of these songs have been recorded only twice before. June's singing is relatively undemonstrative, especially considering that murder is the main theme. The instrumental accompaniment is a counterpoint to the singing, rather than directly supportive of the tunes.

Track listing
 Bonnie James Campbell (Child 210) (words: trad/ tune: Tabor)
 The Duke of Athole's Nurse (Child 212) (trad)
 The Battle of Otterburn (Child 161) (trad)
 Lord Maxwell's Last Goodnight (Child 195) (words: trad/tune: Tabor)
 Hughie Graeme (Child 191) (words:trad/tune: Tabor & Emerson)
 The Border Widow's Lament (Child 106)(trad)
 Fair Margaret and Sweet William (Child 74) (trad)
 Rare Willie (Child 215) (trad)
 Young Johnstone (Child 88) (words:trad/ tune: trad & Tabor & Simpson)
 The Cruel Mother (Child 20) (trad)
 Sir Patrick Spens (Child 58) (words:trad/ tune: trad & Tabor)

Personnel
 June Tabor - vocals
 Huw Warren - piano, cello, piano accordion
 Mark Emerson - viola, violin, piano
 Tim Harries - double bass
 Martin Simpson - guitar
 Kathryn Tickell - Northumbrian pipes

June Tabor albums
2003 albums